Qingdao University of Technology (QUT), formerly known as Qingdao Technological University, is a university in Qingdao, Shandong, China. It offers programs in civil, mechanical, and environmental engineering.

Location
Qingdao Technological University has its main campus located in the Sifang District of Qingdao and has two satellite campuses in Huangdao District west of Jiaozhou Bay and Fei County of Linyi. Altogether, the university covers an area of 1.779.400 square meters and a floor space of 989.000 square meters.

History 
The university was founded in 1953 as the Qingdao Institute of Architecture and Engineering. In 1960 it was renamed into Shandong Metallurgy College. During the decades that followed it developed into a large and all-encompassing university and was placed under the administration of the Provincial Education Department in 1998. In 2004, it was granted full University status.

Programs
QTech offers Bachelor and Master degrees in a variety of studies in Engineering science, Business management, Economics, Arts, and Law. The university organizes language courses and adult education programs.

Doctoral programs include Mechanical Design and Theory, Structural Engineering, Soil Engineering, Environmental Engineering, Heating, Gas Supplying Ventilation and Air-conditioning Engineering.

Administration

Faculties 
Architecture
Arts
Automation Engineering
Automobile and Traffic
Business
Civil Engineering
Communication and Electrical
Computer Engineering
Economics and Trade
Environmental and Municipal Engineering
Foreign Languages
Humanities and Social Science
Management
Mechanical Engineering
Sciences
P.E. Education and Science
College of Adult Education
Higher Vocational Technical Education

International cooperation
Universities that have an partnership agreement with the Qingdao Technological University include:

Illinois Institute of Technology (United States)
Wentworth Institute of Technology (USA)
Montclair State University (USA)
Brock University (Canada)
British Columbia Institute of Technology (Canada)
Charles Darwin University (Australia)
Greenwich University (United Kingdom)
Saint Petersburg State University of Architecture and Civil Engineering (Russia)
University of Karlsruhe (Germany)
University of Applied Sciences Northwest Switzerland (Switzerland)
Royal Institute of Technology (Sweden)
Kyushu University (Japan)
Kwangwoon University (South Korea)
Sejong University (South Korea)
Semyung University (South Korea)
Silla University (South Korea)
Hannan University (South Korea)

Affiliated schools 

Qindao College of Qingdao Technological University is an independent college founded by the QTech in 2004. It is in Chengyang district of Qingdao, adjacent to Mount Lao. The campus encompasses 700.000 square meters with a floor are of 519.000 square meters. The college hosts eight faculties that offer Associate degrees as well as Bachelor studies. More than 16.700 students attend the college (+ more than 300 foreign students per year).

Faculties
School of Civil Engineering
School of Mechanical and Electrical Engineering
School of Computer Sciences
School of Accounting
School of Economics and Trade
School of Architecture
School of Arts
School of Foreign Languages (English, German, French, Business English)

References

External links
Qingdao Technological University Official Website 
Qindao College of Qingdao Technological University Official Website 

Universities and colleges in Qingdao
1953 establishments in China